The canton of Noyelles-sous-Lens is a former canton situated in the department of the Pas-de-Calais and in the Nord-Pas-de-Calais region of northern France. It was disbanded following the French canton reorganisation which came into effect in March 2015. It consisted of 3 communes, which joined the canton of Harnes in 2015. It had a total of 21,608 inhabitants (2012).

Geography 
The canton is organised around Noyelles-sous-Lens in the arrondissement of Lens. The altitude varies from 22m (Fouquières-lès-Lens) to 45m (Billy-Montigny) for an average altitude of 38m.

The canton comprised 3 communes:
Billy-Montigny
Fouquières-lès-Lens
Noyelles-sous-Lens

Population

See also 
Cantons of Pas-de-Calais 
Communes of Pas-de-Calais 
Arrondissements of the Pas-de-Calais department

References

Noyelles-sous-Lens
2015 disestablishments in France
States and territories disestablished in 2015